Cassipourea malosana is a species of plant native to tropical Africa.

Description
Cassipourea malosana is an evergreen shrub or tree, growing to 25 or 30 meters in height, and occasionally up to 45 meters, with a rounded crown. The tree has a straight unbuttressed trunk which can be up to 60 cm in diameter and unbranched up to 20 meters from the ground. The bark is smooth and pale. The leaves are lanceolate, 3 to 10 mm long and 1 to 5 mm wide, with a glossy upper surface and a matte underside.

Distribution and habitat

Cassipourea malosana is native to the mountains of Eastern and Central Africa, from Eritrea through Ethiopia, Somalia, Kenya, Uganda, the eastern Democratic Republic of the Congo, Tanzania, Malawi, Mozambique, Eswatini, and South Africa. There is an outlier population in the Cameroon Highlands of Cameroon.

Cassipourea malosana is found in dry Afromontane forests, often with African juniper (Juniperus procera), Afrocarpus spp., Podocarpus spp., and Olea spp., and as an under-canopy tree in moist Afromontane forests. It is generally found between 1700 and 2600 meters elevation, and occasionally as low as 1100 meters.

Uses
The tree has fine and even-textured wood, and produces hard and heavy timber. It is exploited artisanally and commercially in East Africa, and is usually harvested from the wild. It is also used for firewood.

The tree is occasionally grown as a shade or ornamental tree, and is planted in reforestation projects and for erosion control. Its flowers are a good source of nectar for bees.

The bark has some local medicinal uses. It is cooked in soups to restore strength, made into a tea to help remove a placenta after birth, and applied to skin to treat skin ailments and sunburn and to lighten skin.

References

malosana
Afromontane flora